A general election was held in Montana on November 8, 2022. Both of Montana's seats in the United States House of Representatives, all of the seats in the Montana House of Representatives, and half of the seats in the Montana Senate were up for election, as well as various local offices and ballot measures. The primary election was held on June 7, 2022.

Federal

Congress

House of Representatives

Republicans won both of Montana's seats in the United States House of Representatives.

State

Legislature

Senate

25 of the 50 seats in the Montana Senate were up for election in 2022.

House of Representatives

All 100 seats in the Montana House of Representatives were up for election in 2022.

Ballot measures

Amendment 48

Amendment 48 is a legislatively-referred proposed constitutional amendment. It would amend the Constitution of Montana to require a search warrant to access electronic data. The amendment passed in a landslide.

Contents
The amendment appeared the ballot as follows:

Results

Referendum 131

Referendum 131 is a legislatively-referred proposed state stature. It would enact a law to require medical care be provided to an infant born alive, including after an abortion. The law would be similar to the existing federal Born-Alive Infants Protection Act. The referendum narrowly failed.

Contents
The referendum appeared the ballot as follows:

Results

References

External links

 
Montana